Marco Perella (born May 18, 1949) is an American character actor and author, who has played a variety of small roles in motion pictures shot in Texas.

He is best known for his role in Boyhood (2014), playing an abusive alcoholic second husband, Professor Bill Welbrock, and for his bestselling book, Adventures of A No Name Actor (2001), a humorous autobiography recounting his struggles in the acting world.

Life and career
Perella was born in Houston, Texas, the son of Anthony Paul Perella and Edna Lee Drake. He studied at Stanford University, in Northern California, but left after his junior year. He then worked as a construction worker, firefighter, and musician, before auditioning for a role in West Side Story.

In 1984, he and actress Diane Perella were married in Texas. They have two children.

In the mid-1980s, Perella began to work in film and television. His debut was in Fandango (1985) starring Kevin Costner, but his scenes were cut before the theatrical release. He later took the role as a cab driver in D.O.A. (1988) starring Dennis Quaid and Meg Ryan. Other roles include a police sergeant in the made-for-TV movie Knight Rider 2000 (1991) starring David Hasselhoff, as the Mercer interrogator in Oliver Stone's JFK (1991) starring Kevin Costner, as a roadblock officer in A Perfect World (1993) starring Kevin Costner, Clint Eastwood, and Laura Dern, and as an Anglo father in Lone Star (1996) starring Matthew McConaughey and Kris Kristofferson.

Perella had a recurring role, as Cobalt, in TV's Walker, Texas Ranger (1993–1999) starring Chuck Norris; he also appeared in another episode of Walker, Texas Ranger entitled 'No Way Out' as Zeke, a mercenary working for Caleb Hooks (Michael Parks). He also worked with director Richard Linklater several times, playing Tom Watson in Fast Food Nation (2006) starring Greg Kinnear, Bruce Willis, and Catalina Sandino Moreno, as Donald in A Scanner Darkly (2006) starring Keanu Reeves, Winona Ryder, and Robert Downey Jr., and as Professor Bill Welbrock, the abusive alcoholic second husband, in Boyhood (2014) starring Ellar Coltrane, Patricia Arquette, and Ethan Hawke.

His autobiography, Adventures of A No Name Actor, in which Perella humorously recounts his struggles in the acting world, was published in 2001 and became a bestseller.

Perella lives in Onion Creek, Texas, with his wife, Diane. Besides being involved in acting, they offer on-camera acting classes and audition workshops in Austin.

Selected filmography
D.O.A. (1988) as Cab Driver
It Takes Two (1988) as Dave
Cohen and Tate (1988) as FBI George
Pancho Barnes (1988) (TV movie) as Maj. Cooper
Night Game (1989) as Color Man
Challenger (1990) (TV movie) as Dick Methia
Black Snow (1990) as Charlie
A Killing in a Small Town (1990) (TV movie) as Rick Slocum
Knight Rider 2000 (1991) (TV movie) as Police Sergeant
A Seduction in Travis County (1991) (TV movie) as Poge
JFK (1991) as Mercer Interrogator
Murder in the Heartland (1993) (TV Mini-Series) as Bob Von Busch
My Boyfriend's Back (1993) as Townsperson
Fatal Deception: Mrs. Lee Harvey Oswald (1993) (TV movie) as 2nd Young Guy
A Perfect World (1993) as Road Block Officer
The Chase (1994) as Cop #2
Shadows of Desire (1994) (TV movie) as Man #1
Tall, Dark and Deadly (1995) (TV movie) as Waiter
The Tuskegee Airmen (1995) (TV movie) as Col. Sirca
The Man with the Perfect Swing (1995) as Chuck Carter
Lone Star (1996) as Anglo Father
Two Mothers for Zachary (1996) (TV movie) as Reporter #2
The People Next Door (1996) (TV movie) as Simms, Manager
Deep in the Heart (1996) as Mickey / Coach
Keys to Tulsa (1997) as Bedford Shaw
To Live Again (1998) (TV movie) as News Anchor
Home Fries (1998) as Good Ol' Boy in Pickup
Varsity Blues (1999) as Dr. Benton
Brothers. Dogs. And God (2000) as Buddy
Hell Swarm (2000) (TV movie) as Brad Dempsey
Picnic (2000) (TV movie) as Police Chief
Miss Congeniality (2000) as Starbucks Guy
Beyond the Prairie, Part 2: The True Story of Laura Ingalls Wilder (2002) (TV movie) as Grady
The Life of David Gale (2003) as TV Host
No Pain, No Gain (2005) as Preppy Customer
Friday Night Lights (2004) as Booster
The Wendell Baker Story (2005) as Investigator
Sin City (2005) as Skinny Dude
The King (2005) as Chairman
Fast Food Nation (2006) as Tom Watson
A Scanner Darkly (2006) as Donald
Infamous (2006) as Clifford Hope
Elvis and Anabelle (2007) as Doctor
Love and Mary (2007) as Vince
Broke Sky (2007) as Paul
Spirit Camp (2009) as Nikki's Dad
Deep in the Heart (2012) as Fred
This Is Where We Live (2013) as Doctor Benson
Boyhood (2014) as Professor Bill Welbrock
The Teller and the Truth (2015) as FBI Agent Carl Winstead
My All American (2015) as Dr. Martin
The Devil's Candy (2015) as Sgt. Davis
A Room Full of Nothing (2019) as Steve

TV series
Dangerous Curves (1992–1993) as Bruder Larry
Walker, Texas Ranger (1993–1999) as Cobalt / Zeke
Wishbone (1995) as Seymour LaVista
Friday Night Lights (2008) as Big Shot
Dallas (2013) as Mark-Oil Executive
In an Instant (2015) as Koski's neighbor
The Leftovers (2015) as Charlie Simpson
American Crime (2016) as Senator Robert Butler

References

External links
Personal site

1949 births
Living people
American male film actors
American male television actors
20th-century American male actors
21st-century American male actors
Stanford University people
Male actors from Texas